Teen Wolf  is a 1985 American coming-of-age comedy film directed by Rod Daniel and written by Jeph Loeb and Matthew Weisman. Michael J. Fox stars as the title character, a high school student whose ordinary life is changed when he discovers that he is a werewolf. James Hampton, Scott Paulin, Susan Ursitti, Jerry Levine, Matt Adler, and Jay Tarses appear in supporting roles. Filming took place from November to December 1984.

Teen Wolf was released on August 23, 1985, by Atlantic Releasing Corporation. It received mixed reviews, but was a commercial success, grossing over $80 million on a $4 million budget. The film's success spawned an animated series adaptation in 1986 and a 1987 sequel that featured Hampton and Mark Holton as the only returning cast members. Teen Wolf also influenced a supernatural drama series of the same name that aired on MTV from 2011 to 2017.

Plot
Scott Howard, a 17-year-old high school student, is tired of just being average. Living in a small town in Nebraska, his only claim to popularity is playing for the Beavers, his school's unsuccessful basketball team. Scott fawns after Pamela Wells even though she is dating his rival Mick who plays for the Dragons, an opposing team that bullies him on the court. Completely oblivious to the affections of his best friend Boof, Scott constantly rebuffs her advances due to their history together.

After startling changes such as long hair suddenly sprouting on his hands, he decides to quit the team, but his coach, Finstock, changes his mind. Scoring a keg with his friend Stiles for a party, Scott and Boof end up alone in a closet and Scott gets rough when they begin making out, accidentally clawing her back. When he returns home, he undergoes a strange transformation, discovering he is a werewolf. His father Harold reveals he is one too, and that he had hoped Scott would not inherit the curse because 'sometimes it skips a generation'.

Scott reveals his secret to Stiles, who agrees to keep it a secret. But, when Scott becomes stressed on the court, he becomes the wolf and helps win their first game in three years. This has an unexpected result of fame and popularity as the high school is overwhelmed with 'Wolf Fever'. Scott is alienated from Boof and his teammates as he begins to hog the ball during games.

Stiles merchandises "Teen Wolf" paraphernalia and Pamela finally begins paying attention to Scott. After he gets a role as a "werewolf cavalryman" in the school play alongside her, she comes onto him in the dressing room and they have sex. Later, after a date set up to make Mick jealous, Pamela tells Scott that she is not interested in him as a boyfriend, much to his disappointment. Harold tells Scott he is responsible for vice principal Rusty Thorne breathing down his neck due to a scare he had given him when he was in high school. He advises Scott to be himself.

Boof agrees to go with Scott to the upcoming Spring Dance, but only if he goes as himself. Scott goes alone as the Wolf instead. She takes him into the hallway and they kiss, which turns Scott back into himself. When they return to the dance, Scott garners everyone's attention, including Pamela. A jealous Mick punches him in the face, then proceeds to insult Boof and taunt Scott until the Wolf angrily attacks. Scott runs out of the hall right into Thorne, who threatens expulsion. Harold defends his son before going on to intimidate Thorne by growling in his face, causing the vice principal to wet himself.

Scott renounces using the Wolf and quits the basketball team. During the championship game, he arrives to rally his teammates to play without the Wolf. Despite the odds, the team begins to work together and they make ground against the Dragons. During the final quarter, behind by one point, Scott is fouled by Mick at the buzzer. He makes both free throws, winning the championship. Brushing past Pamela, he kisses Boof as his father embraces them both. Mick tells Pamela that they should leave, but she tells him to "drop dead" and storms off while everyone else celebrates the victory.

Cast

Production
Teen Wolf was one of the first scripts written by Jeph Loeb. Loeb was hired to write it because the studio, after the surprising success of the film Valley Girl, wanted to make a comedy that would cost almost nothing and take very little time to film. The project came together when Michael J. Fox accepted the lead role and his Family Ties co-star Meredith Baxter-Birney became pregnant, which created a delay in the sitcom's filming that allowed Fox time to complete filming and then return to his sitcom. 

On a production budget of $4 million, principal photography for Teen Wolf began in November 1984 and concluded the next month.  James Hampton originally auditioned for the role of Coach Bobby Finstock but was later cast as Harold Howard. The beaver mascot logo used in the film was the Oregon State University Beavers logo, in use by the university at that time.

Release
Atlantic Releasing spent $4 million on advertising for Teen Wolf. Released in the U.S. on August 23, 1985, Teen Wolf debuted at No. 2 in its opening weekend, behind Back to the Future (also starring Michael J. Fox). After its initial run, the film grossed $33,086,661 domestically, with a worldwide gross of about $80 million.

Teen Wolf was first released on DVD via MGM in a "Double Feature" pack with its sequel Teen Wolf Too on August 27, 2002. The film was later released on Blu-ray on March 29, 2011. The only special feature available on any of the releases is the film's theatrical trailer. The film was reissued on Blu-ray Disc on August 8, 2017, by Scream! Factory, with a remastered transfer and a new "making of" featurette.

Critical response
The film's critical reception was at best mixed. Review aggregator Rotten Tomatoes reports that 42% of 33 critics have given the film a positive review, with a rating average of 5.1 out of 10. The consensus summarizes: "Though Michael J. Fox is as charismatic as ever, Teen Wolfs coming-of-age themes can't help but feel a little stale and formulaic." On Metacritic, the film has a 25 out of 100 rating based on 5 critics, indicating "generally unfavorable reviews".

Vincent Canby of The New York Times gave the film a negative review calling it "aggressively boring". He went on to say that "the film is overacted by everybody except Mr. Fox, who is seen to far better advantage in Back to the Future."

Colin Greenland reviewed Teen Wolf for White Dwarf #75, and stated that "Anxious that their movie should be perfectly wholesome, clean and bloodless, writers and director forgot Scott was supposed to be a werewolf, and made him a basketball star instead."

Soundtrack

Legacy

Animated television series

An animated series adaptation aired on CBS for two seasons from 1986 to 1987. Townsend Coleman voiced the lead role of Scott Howard, with James Hampton reprising his role as Harold Howard. The series retained the basic premise and most of the characters from the film, but made changes to the story, such as Scott attempting to keep his werewolf identity secret from the general public. It also featured new characters, including Scott's grandparents (voiced by Stacy Keach Sr. and June Foray) and younger sister Lupe.

Sequels

A sequel entitled Teen Wolf Too was released in 1987 and starred Jason Bateman as Todd Howard, Scott Howard's cousin. Only James Hampton and Mark Holton returned from the original film, with the sequel focusing mostly on new characters led by Todd. Teen Wolf Too received negative reviews and failed to match the success of its predecessor, grossing $7.9 million on a $3 million budget. A second sequel starring Alyssa Milano was planned, but never filmed. Another female version of Teen Wolf was in the works that later developed into 1989's Teen Witch.

Live-action television series

MTV greenlit a television series adaptation in 2009 that was developed by Jeff Davis. While also centered on a high school student who becomes a werewolf, the story was reimagined as a supernatural teen drama with elements of action and horror. Tyler Posey portrayed the title character, whose name was changed to Scott McCall for the series. It aired for six seasons from 2011 to 2017. A film continuation, Teen Wolf: The Movie, was released on January 26, 2023.

See also
 I Was a Teenage Werewolf (1957), an earlier horror film about a high school teenage werewolf
 Full Moon High (1981), an earlier comedy-horror film about a high school teenage werewolf
 Big Wolf on Campus (1999), a Canadian TV series on Fox Family, produced by Saban Entertainment about a high-school senior boy who has been bitten by a werewolf, becoming one himself.

References

External links
 
 
 
 

 
1980s American films
1980s coming-of-age comedy films
1980s English-language films
1985 films
1985 directorial debut films
1985 comedy films
1980s fantasy comedy films
1980s high school films
1985 independent films
1980s sports comedy films
1980s teen comedy films
American coming-of-age comedy films
American basketball films
American fantasy comedy films
American high school films
American independent films
American sports comedy films
American teen comedy films
American werewolf films
Atlantic Entertainment Group films
Films adapted into television shows
Films directed by Rod Daniel
Films about shapeshifting
Films scored by Miles Goodman
Films with screenplays by Jeph Loeb
Films about puberty